Friedrich Krebs may refer to:

 Friedrich Krebs (organ builder) (died 1493), pipe organ builder
 Friedrich Krebs (artist) (c.1749–1815), fraktur artist
 Friedrich Krebs (minister) (1832–1905), first chief apostle of the New Apostolic Church
 Friedrich Krebs (mayor) (1894–1961), mayor of Frankfurt